Trading Spaces: Boys vs. Girls is an American 2003 reality television series spin-off of the home redecorating series, Trading Spaces, hosted by Diane Mizota. During the fourth and final season, Chuck Cureau hosted seven episodes until the show ended in 2005. In each episode, two friends (ranging in age from 8 to 14) redecorate each other's bedrooms in themes relating to the other's styles or hobbies. The series aired on Discovery Kids from May 17, 2003 to December 3, 2005. After the series ended, reruns continued to air on The Hub until June 24, 2011.

Cast

Designers
Jordin Ruderman 
Scott Sicari

Carpenters
Ginene Licata 
Barte Shadlow

Guest Appearances
Mia Hamm 
Daryl Sabara 
Alexa Vega

Episodes

Season 1

Season 2

Season 3

During episode 27, Ginene injures her thumb; therefore, Barte takes over the carpentry duties for the other team.
In episode 28, Barte does the carpentry work for both teams.
Carter Oosterhouse takes over the carpentry duties in episode 29, while Ginene is still nursing her injury. She will return for the next episode along with Diane Mizota. Paige Davis is filling in for Diane Mizota.

Season 4

Chuck Cureau took over the hosting duties for this season.

References 

Discovery Kids original programming
Home renovation television series
2000s American reality television series
2003 American television series debuts
2005 American television series endings
American educational television series
American television spin-offs
English-language television shows
Reality television spin-offs
Television series about children
Television series about teenagers